Route 462, also known as Point au Mal Road, is a  north–south highway on the western coast of Newfoundland in the Canadian province of Newfoundland and Labrador. It connects the communities of Fox Island River and Point au Mal with Route 460 and the town of Port au Port.

Route description

Route 462 begins at an intersection with Route 460 in Port au Port and it winds its northward through hilly terrain along the coastline to leave town and pass through rural areas for several kilometres. The highway now enters the designated place of Fox Island River-Point au Mal and passes through community of Point au Mal before entering Fox Island River, where Route 462 comes to a dead end at the community's harbour along the river of the same name.

Major intersections

References

462